The economy of Nepal is developing category and largely dependent on agriculture and remittances. An isolated, industrial society until the mid-20th century, Nepal entered the modern era in 1951 without schools, hospitals, roads, telecommunications, electric power, industry, or civil service. The country has, however, made progress toward sustainable economic growth since the 1950s. The country was opened to economic liberalization, leading to economic growth and improvement in living standards when compared to the past. The biggest challenges faced by the country in achieving higher economic development are the frequent changes in political leadership, as well as corruption.

Nepal has used a series of five-year plans in an attempt to make progress in economic development.  It completed its ninth economic development plan in 2002; its currency has been made convertible, and 17 state enterprises have been privatised. Foreign aid to Nepal accounts for more than half of the development budget. Government priorities over the years have been the development of transportation and communication facilities, agriculture, and industry. Since 1975, improved government administration and rural development efforts have been emphasised.

Agriculture remains Nepal's principal economic activity, employing about 65% of the population and providing 31.7% of GDP. Only about 20% of the total area is cultivable; another 40.7% is forested (i.e., covered by shrubs, pastureland and forest); most of the rest is mountainous. Fruits and vegetables (apples, pears, tomatoes, various salads, peach, nectarine, potatoes), as well as rice and wheat are the main food crops. The lowland Terai region produces an agricultural surplus, part of which supplies the food-deficient hill areas.

GDP is heavily dependent on remittances (9.1%) of foreign workers.  Subsequently, economic development in social services and infrastructure in Nepal has not made dramatic progress. A countrywide primary education system is under development, and Tribhuvan University has several campuses. Although eradication efforts continue, malaria had been controlled in the fertile but previously uninhabitable Terai region in the south. Kathmandu is linked to India and nearby hill regions by road and an expanding highway network. The capital was almost out of fuel and supplies, due to a crippling general strike in southern Nepal on 17 February 2008.

Major towns are connected to the capital by telephone and domestic air services. The export-oriented carpet and garment industries have grown rapidly in recent years. Together, they account for approximately 70% of the country's merchandise exports.

The Cost of Living Index in Nepal is comparatively lower than many countries but not the least. The quality of life has declined to a much less desirous value in recent years. In the 2021 Global Hunger Index, Nepal ranks 76th out of the 116 countries with sufficient data to calculate 2021 GHI scores. With a score of 19.1, Nepal has a level of hunger that is moderate.

Foreign investments and taxation
Huge numbers of Small Foreign Investments come to Nepal via the Non Resident Nepali, who are investing in many sectors. Nepal has a huge potential for hydroelectricity. Accordingly, a large number of foreign companies are willing to invest in Nepal, but political instability has stopped the process.
Nepal has entered into agreements for avoidance of double taxation (all in credit method) with 10 countries (PSRD) since 2000. Similarly, it has Investment protection agreements with 5 countries (PSRD) since 1983. In 2014, Nepal restricted the Foreign aid by setting a minimum limit for foreign grants, soft and commercial loans from its development partners.

Imports and exports

Nepal's merchandise trade balance has improved somewhat since 2000 with the growth of the carpet and garment industries. In the fiscal year 2000–2001, exports posted a greater increase (14%) than imports (4.5%), helping bring the trade deficit down by 4% from the previous year to $749 million. Recently, the European Union has become the largest buyer of ready-made garments; fruits and vegetables (mostly apples, pears, tomatoes, various salads, peach, nectarine, potatoes, rice) from Nepal. Exports to the EU accounted for 46.13 percent of the country's garment exports.

The annual monsoon rain strongly influences economic growth. From 1996 to 1999, real GDP growth averaged less than 4%. The growth rate recovered in 1999, rising to 6% before slipping slightly in 2001 to 5.5%.

Strong export performance, including earnings from tourism, and external aid have helped improve the overall balance of payments and increase international reserves. Nepal receives substantial amounts of external assistance from the United Kingdom, the United States, Japan, Germany, and the Nordic countries.

Several multilateral organisations such as the World Bank, the Asian Development Bank, and the UN Development Programme also provide assistance. In June 1998, Nepal submitted its memorandum on a foreign trade regime to the World Trade Organization and in May 2000 began direct negotiations on its accession.

Resources

Progress has been made in exploiting Nepal's natural resources, tourism and hydroelectricity. With eight of the world's 10 highest mountain peaks, including Mount Everest at 8,848.86 m. In the early 1990s, one large public sector project and a number of private projects were planned; some have been completed. The most significant private sector financed hydroelectric projects currently in operation are the Khimti Khola (60 MW) and the Bhote Koshi Project (36 MW). The project is still undergoing and has dependency on China, India and Japan to take the further steps.

Nepal has 83,000 MW of theoretical and 42,133 MW of technically/financially viable hydroelectric potential, however the total installed capacity, at present, is 2500 MW and increasing.

The environmental impact of Nepal's hydroelectric Own calendar (Bikram Sambat) New year in mid- April projects has been limited by the fact that most are "run-of-the-river" with only one storage project undertaken to date. The largest hydroelectric plant under consideration is the West Seti Dam (750 MW) storage project dedicated to exports to be built by the private sector. Negotiations with India for a power purchase agreement have been underway for several years, but agreement on pricing and financing remains a problem. Currently demand for electricity is increasing at 8-10% a year whereas Nepal's option to have agreement with India will make this fulfilment against demand. As of June 2022  surplus electricity up to 364 MWp by Nepal is exported to India.

Population pressure on natural resources is increasing. Over-population is already straining the "carrying capacity" of the middle hill areas, particularly the Kathmandu Valley, resulting in the depletion of forest cover for crops, fuel, and fodder and contributing to erosion and flooding. Although steep mountain terrain makes exploitation difficult, mineral surveys have found small deposits of limestone, magnesite, zinc, copper, iron, mica, lead, and cobalt. Coal mining is also done with 11522 tones produced in 2018 alone.

The development of hydroelectric power projects also cause some tension with local indigenous groups, recently empowered by Nepal's ratification of ILO Convention 169.

Macro-economic trend

This is a chart of trend of gross domestic product of Nepal at market prices estimated by the International Monetary Fund and EconStats with figures in millions of Nepali Rupees.

The following table shows the main economic indicators in 1980–2018.

Statistics

GDP:  purchasing power parity - $84.37 Billion (2018 est.)

GDP - real growth rate: 21.77% (2017)

GDP - per capita:  purchasing power parity (current international $) - $2700 (2017 est.)
GDP - composition by sector:
agriculture: 17%
industry:    13.5%
services:    60.5% (2017 est.)
tourism:     9%

Population below poverty line: 25.6% (2017/2018)

Household income or consumption by percentage share:
lowest 10%:   3.2%
highest 10%: 29.8% (1995–96)

Inflation rate (consumer prices):  4.5% (2017)

Labour force: 4 million (2016 est.) 

Labor force - by occupation: agriculture 19%, services 69%, industry 12% (2014 est.)

Unemployment rate:  1.47% (2017 est.)

Budget:
revenues: $5.954 billion
expenditures: $5.974 billion, including capital expenditures of $NA (2017 est.)

Industries:
tourism, carpet, textile; small rice, jute, sugar, and oilseed mills; cigarette; cement and brick production

Industrial production growth rate:  10.9% (2017 est.):

Electricity - production:  41,083 GWh (2017)

Electricity - production by source:
fossil fuel: 7.5%
hydro:      91.5%
nuclear:        0.3%
other:          0.7% (2001)

Available energy:6957.73 GWh (2017)
NEA Hydro:2290.78 GWh (2014)
NEA Thermal:9.56 GWh (2014)
purchase (total):2331.17 GWh (2014)
India (purchase):2175.04 GWh (2017)
Nepal (IPP):1258.94 GWh (2014)

Electricity - consumption:  4,776.53 GWh (2017)

Electricity - exports:  856 GWh (2001)
Electricity - imports:  12 GWh (2001)

Oil - production:   (2001 est.)

Oil - consumption:  2001

Agriculture - products:
Fruits and vegetables, mostly: apples, pears, tomatoes, peaches, nectarines, potatoes, rice, maize, wheat, sugarcane, root crops, milk, and buffalo meat.

Exports:  $1.29 billion f.o.b., but does not include unrecorded border trade with India (2020 est.)

Exports - commodities: carpets, clothing, leather goods, jute goods, grain

Exports - partners: India 56.6%, US 11.5%, Turkey 9.2% (2016 est.)

Imports:  $1.6 billion f.o.b. (2021 est.)

Imports - commodities: gold, machinery and equipment, petroleum products, electrical goods, medicine

Imports - partners:  India 70.1%, China 10.3%, UAE 2.6%, Singapore 2.1%, Saudi Arabia 1.2%. (2016 est.)

Debt - external:  $8.8 billion (2021 est.)

Economic aid - recipient:  $2 billion (FY 2019/20)

Currency: 1 Nepali rupee (NPR) = 100 paisa

Fiscal year: 16 July - 15 July

See also

Special Economic Zones (Nepal)
Mineral resources of Nepal

References

External links
Global Economic Prospects: Growth Prospects for South Asia The World Bank, 13 December 2006
World Bank Summary Trade Statistics Nepal
Nepal Budget Summary &  formulation process

Economics in developing countries
 
Nepal